"Love Is Like Oxygen" is a song by the British band Sweet and released in January 1978. It was co-written by the group's guitarist Andy Scott, and Trevor Griffin, a musician who had played with various unsuccessful bands before becoming a roadie and sound engineer. The song was a departure from earlier recordings by Sweet, which were more guitar-driven, and featured high vocal harmonies. The extended album version of the song (6 minutes 57 seconds), which appeared on their album Level Headed, incorporates strings and has some disco elements.

Their first release on the Polydor label after their departure from RCA, it was also their last Top 10 hit, reaching No. 4 in New Zealand; No. 6 in Switzerland; No. 8 in Belgium, Canada, and the United States; No. 9 in the United Kingdom and Australia; and No. 10 in West Germany.

Later that year it was honoured with a Song of the Year nomination at the Ivor Novello Awards, although beaten by "Baker Street" by Gerry Rafferty. The song is frequently included on greatest hits compilations, usually in its edited single version.

Chart performance

Weekly charts

Year-end charts

References

External links
 

1977 songs
1978 singles
British power pop songs
Capitol Records singles
Songs written by Andy Scott (guitarist)
The Sweet songs
Polydor Records singles